Chorivalva grandialata is a moth of the family Gelechiidae. It is found in Korea and the Russian Far East.

References

Moths described in 1988
Litini